Canton Historic District may refer to:

Canton Center Historic District, Canton, Connecticut, NRHP-listed
Canton Historic District (Canton, Georgia), NRHP-listed in Cherokee County
Canton Commercial Historic District, Canton, Georgia
Canton Historic District (Baltimore, Maryland), NRHP-listed and part of the Canton, Baltimore neighborhood
Canton Corner Historic District, Canton, Massachusetts, NRHP-listed
Canton Courthouse Square Historic District, Canton, Mississippi, NRHP-listed in Madison County
East Canton Historic District, Canton, Mississippi, NRHP-listed in Madison County
Canton Main Street Historic District, Canton, North Carolina, NRHP-listed
Upper Downtown Canton Historic District, Canton, Ohio, NRHP-listed in Stark County